Santo Antônio do Sudoeste is a municipality in the state of Paraná, Brazil with a population of 20,261 inhabitants. It is on the border between Argentina and Brazil, opposite the Argentine city of San Antonio, Misiones. The San Antonio River separates the two cities.

References 

Municipalities in Paraná